Sam Prendergast (born 12 February, 2003) is an Irish rugby union player who plays as a fly-half for Ireland national under-20 rugby union team. He is currently a member of Leinster's academy as of the 2022–23 season and represents Lansdowne in the amateur All-Ireland League..

Early life
Prendergast attended Newbridge College in Newbridge, County Kildare where he played as a scrum-half before he had a growth spurt. He played in 2020 as the school secured a place in the Leinster Senior Schools Cup final against Clongowes Wood. However, the final was never played due to the Covid-19 pandemic.

Career
Pendergast played club rugby for Cill Dara RFC and Lansdowne FC and joined the Leinster Rugby academy in 2022. He kicked a late long-distance penalty to clinch a series victory for Ireland under-20s over England over-20s in July 2022. He kicked another late penalty in February 2023 as Ireland under-20s beat France under-20s in the 2023 Six Nations Under 20s Championship. He was singled out for praise for his performances during the tournament. Praise has also come from former Ireland international Andrew Trimble, former New Zealand international Sonny Bill Williams,  and he was identified by BBC Sport as one of the stars of the 2023 under-20 Six Nations tournament.

Personal life
He is the younger brother of Connacht Rugby and Ireland Rugby international Cian Prendergast.

References

External links

2004 births
Living people
Leinster Rugby players
Rugby union fly-halves
Irish rugby union players
Rugby union players from County Kildare